Mateus Filipe Gregório Machado (born  5 July 1993) is a Brazilian Olympic weightlifter. He has qualified for the 2016 Summer Olympics. In 2018 he tested positive for Oxandrolone metabolites and was banned until 2022 by the International Weightlifting Federation.

Results

References

External links 
 
 
 
 

1993 births
Living people
Brazilian male weightlifters
Weightlifters at the 2016 Summer Olympics
Olympic weightlifters of Brazil
Pan American Games medalists in weightlifting
Weightlifters at the 2015 Pan American Games
Pan American Games silver medalists for Brazil
Medalists at the 2015 Pan American Games
21st-century Brazilian people